The United Nations Verification Mission in Colombia (UNVIC) began on 26 September 2017, following the conclusion of the United Nations Mission in Colombia. The mission supports the peace process amid the Colombian conflict and was extended in 2023 by United Nations Security Council Resolution 2673.

References 

Human rights in Colombia
Colombia
Guatemalan Civil War
Colombia and the United Nations
Colombian peace process
Colombian conflict
2010s in Colombia
2020s in Colombia